The West Indies National Football Team is the team that represents the West Indies. It is not a member of FIFA, CFU or CONCACAF, but is a  member of the N.F.-Board, an organisation for teams who are not members of FIFA. They were admitted to the N.F.-Board as a provisional member in 2013.

The West Indies FA will use Caribbean players from all over the world who have not played with their national team and give them the opportunity to represent the West Indies and let them experience international football.

The West Indies FA or WIFA will initially be based in Trinidad and Tobago and were scheduled to play in 2014's Viva World Cup. Unfortunately, due to the short timescale afforded them, they were unable to take the field.

History
There have been many attempts to put a West Indies football team together but in the past they mostly failed although there was the British Caribbean Football Association established in 1957 and played various matches as the select team from the Caribbean mostly against English opposition.

Modern Era
Re-imaged in 2013, the WIFA organisation will play at various levels and encompass all forms of association football. Although a regional squad has been formed, matches have yet to be played as the team head coach assesses the current crop of players.

Due to the nature of the organisation, players from across the region have the opportunity to participate on a world footballing stage where perhaps they wouldn't be offered that chance with their home nation.

The development squad, WIFA Pirates played their first ever proper match on January 26, 2015 in a friendly match against Trinidad and Tobago Football Association side Petrotrin Sports Club, winning 5–4.

WIFA will also host a Futsal team based out of London, UK.

Current Management

WIFA have formed a group of executives, all of whom have been brought together, working in various fields, heading towards achieving the same goal.

Team colors

The WIFA will play its home matches in a brown and yellow kit and away matches in a red and yellow kit.

WIFA Squads

National Squad

Local Squad (WIFA Pirates)

WIFA partnered  with Texas Premier Soccer League club side Galveston Pirate SC on August 20, 2014. The partnership between both clubs saw the introduction of the WIFA Pirates, which would act as the WIFA development squad.

{-}

Futsal

The West Indies Futsal team is based in London UK where many of the West Indies Futsal player participate in the UK leagues.
The team is headed by Englishman Robert Brassett and continues to grow since its start in 2014.

Results and fixtures

Recent results

References

Football
Caribbean national association football teams
North American national and official selection-teams not affiliated to FIFA